Gasherbrum II; surveyed as K4, is the 13th highest mountain in the world at  above sea level. It is the third-highest peak of the Gasherbrum massif, and is located in the Karakoram, on the border between Gilgit–Baltistan, Pakistan and Xinjiang, China. The mountain was first climbed on July 7, 1956, by an Austrian expedition which included Fritz Moravec, Josef Larch, and Hans Willenpart.

Geography
Gasherbrum II is located on the border of Gilgit–Baltistan, Pakistan, and Xinjiang, China. It is part of the Karakoram mountain range in the Himalayas, and located at the top of the Baltoro Glacier. With an elevation of  it is the third-highest member of the Gasherbrum group, behind Gasherbrum I and Broad Peak. Gasherbrum III is sometimes considered to be a subpeak of Gasherbrum II, because the former has a topographic prominence of only .

Naming
In 1856, Thomas George Montgomerie, a member of the British Royal Engineers and part of the Great Trigonometric Survey, sighted the mountain and named it "K4", meaning the fourth mountain of Karakoram. The name "Gasherbrum" comes from the Balti words rgasha ("beautiful") and brum ("mountain"). Contrary to popular belief, it does not mean "shining wall", which is how Sir William Martin Conway described nearby Gasherbrum IV on an 1892 exploration.

Climbing history
The mountains of the Gasherbrum group were explored in 1909 by the Duke of the Abruzzi and Vittorio Sella. The Abruzzi Glacier, a tributary of the Baltoro Glacier, is named after the Duke.

In 1934, Günter Dyhrenfurth and his International Himalayan Expedition, including André Roch, explored Gasherbrum I and II, making it  up Gasherbrum II.

The first ascent came on July 7, 1956, by Austrians Fritz Moravec, Josef Larch and Hans Willenpart by the Southwest Ridge. After they set up Camp I, they had to descend, and found the camp—and all their supplies and food—buried by an avalanche when they returned. Despite this, they decided to make a quick summit attempt. After opening up a route, they left Camp III on July 6. The group spent the night in a bivouac sack and reached the top at 11:30 am the next day.

In 1975, four expeditions successfully climbed Gasherbrum II, including Jean-Pierre Fresafond's French expedition, a Polish group under Janusz Onyszkiewicz, and another Polish expedition led by Wanda Rutkiewicz.

Four years later, a Chilean group claimed to have used the "normal" route to reach the top. Several others, including Reinhard Karl, Hanns Schell, and Kurt Diemberger also reached the summit.

Swiss Mountaineers Romolo Nottaris and Tiziano Zünd were the first to reach the summit in alpine style on August 3rd, 1981.

On July 24, 1982, Reinhold Messner, along with Nazir Sabir and Sher Khan, climbed the peak via the Southwest Ridge. During the ascent, Messner discovered the body of a previously missing Austrian mountaineer, whom he buried two years later at the G I – G II crossing. During that year, Messner also climbed two other eight-thousanders, Kangchenjunga and Broad Peak, and attempted Cho Oyu. He wrote a book, 3 x 8000: My Great Year in the Himalaya, about this.

In July 1984, Reinhold Messner and Hans Kammerlander reached both Gasherbrum II and Gasherbrum I without returning to base camp, in alpine style.

In August 1984, a French expedition led by Daniel Croisot, reached summit and achieved the integral first descent by ski of Gasherbrum II, as witnessed and joined by Dominique Dock who was medical officer for the expedition.

In August 1986, Gasherbrum II was successfully ascended by a Slovene expedition in only 32 hours from the base to the peak, with only 22 hours of climbing and 10 hours of rest at the altitude of 5900 m. This was by far the fastest ascent until then.

In July 1996, Jean-Christophe Lafaille climbed Gasherbrum I and II in four days, without stopping at Base Camp in between.

In 1997 Anatoli Boukreev achieved a solo speed ascent, camp ABC (5800 metres) to summit in 9 hours 30 min.

In 2006, Sebastian Haag and Benedikt Böhm climbed Gasherbrum II twice within a week. At 8:00 am on July 29, they reached the top and then skied down without abseiling or removing their skis. They rested for a few days before leaving Camp I again on August 3. They started out fast, reaching Camp IV in six hours, but  of fresh snow slowed them down, and they reached the summit after over six hours of tough climbing. They descended on skis again, this time made even more dangerous by packed-down snow and the risk of avalanche. Despite this, they both made it safely back to Camp I in under 17 hours, whereas a normal expedition takes four to seven days.

Karl Unterkircher and Daniele Bernasconi, two Italians, climbed Gasherbrum II in 2007 in alpine style. They were the first to use the North Face through China. The route had been attempted a year earlier by a German–Swiss team, but they abandoned it after an avalanche. They arrived at the summit around 8:00 pm on July 20, after spending the night in a bivouac shelter. A third member, Michele Compagnoni, grandson of Achille Compagnoni, turned back just  before the summit. The team reunited and descended down the normal, northwest route.

On July 22, 2011, Leila Esfandyari successfully completed the ascent to the peak but she died while descending.

On February 2, 2011, Cory Richards, Denis Urubko, and Simone Moro became the first to ascend Gasherbrum II in winter. Despite being buried by a class-four avalanche, they reached the summit at 11:30 am, without supplemental oxygen or porters. Richards, who was the first American to climb an eight-thousander in winter, filmed the expedition, which he turned into the film Cold.

On July 16, 2018, Felix Berg and Adam Bielecki summited Gasherbrum II making what is arguably the first ascent of the true West Face.

See also

 Eight-thousander
 List of mountains in China
 List of mountains in Pakistan
 List of highest mountains

Bibliography

Notes and references

Further reading

External links

 Gasherbrum II on Himalaya-Info.org (German)
 Gasherbrum II on Summitpost
 Gasherbrum II: A Journey to 26,360 Feet in the Karakoram 
 Gasherbrum II-express debrief: The first German ski descent of G2; a 17-hour round trip
 
 Cold on YouTube

Eight-thousanders of the Karakoram
Mountains of Gilgit-Baltistan
Mountains of Xinjiang
China–Pakistan border
International mountains of Asia